Jake Paque is an American voice actor. He is best known for playing Caydan Phoenix in the video game Modern Combat 5.

Filmography

Animation
 Super 4 – Ruby's Father / Lenny / Rock Brock / Various
 Winx Club – Brandon (DuArt Film and Video, season 7)
 Angel's Friends – Merko / Various
 Egyxos – Horus / Hatanor
 World War Blue – Boyz/Byse
 Pokémon the Movie: Genesect and the Legend Awakened – Eric
 Mobile Suit Gundam Thunderbolt – Brian
 Robin Hood: Mischief in Sherwood – Little John
 The Stolen Princess – Ratmir
 The Dragon Spell – Bogdan
 Birdboy: The Forgotten Children – Birdman
 Yu-Gi-Oh! ZEXAL II - Dumon, Devon Knox
 Yu-Gi-Oh! VRAINS – Yusaku Fujiki/ Playmaker
 Yu-Gi-Oh! Sevens - Kaizo

Video games
 Modern Combat 5 – Caydan Phoenix
 Brothers in Arms 3 – Mathieu Chaput
 Dungeon Hunter 5 – Various
 MXGP The Official Motocross Videogame – Announcer
 Dragon Mania Legends – Various

References

External links 
 
 
 
 StagNation Productions – Production Company

Living people
American male video game actors
American male voice actors
Place of birth missing (living people)
Year of birth missing (living people)